Pstroszyce Drugie  is a village in the administrative district of Gmina Miechów, within Miechów County, Lesser Poland Voivodeship, in southern Poland.

References

Pstroszyce Drugie